Melitaea persea is a butterfly of the family Nymphalidae. It is found from Iran and Asia Minor to Afghanistan and the western parts of the Tian Shan mountains.

Subspecies
Melitaea persea caucasica Staudinger, 1870
Melitaea persea dogsoni Grose-Smith, 1887
Melitaea persea paphlagonia Fruhstorfer, 1917
Melitaea persea montium Belter, 1934 (Syria, Lebanon, Israel)
Melitaea persea sargon Hemming, 1932 (central Saudi Arabia, Iraq)

References

Butterflies described in 1850
Melitaea
Butterflies of Asia
Taxa named by Vincenz Kollar